Matson Films is an American independent film distributor based in San Francisco.  Founded in 2004, it specializes in the distribution, production and sales of independent feature films.  Matson Films released the award-winning (Toronto Film Festival, Gen Art Film Festival, U.S. Comedy Arts Festival) comedy It's All Gone Pete Tong to 30 markets in April 2005, and in 2009  released the award-winning drama Sinner.

Releases

 Gurukulam (2014)
 Sinner (2009)
 Towncraft (2007)
 Snowblind (2006)
 The World's Best Prom (2006)
 It's All Gone Pete Tong (2005)

References

External links
 Matson Films official website

Film distributors of the United States
Film production companies of the United States
Companies based in California